The Annamite striped rabbit (Nesolagus timminsi) is a species of rabbit native to the Annamite mountain range on the Laos-Vietnam border. The rabbit is striped, with a red rump, and resembles the Sumatran striped rabbit. It only recently became known to Western scientists: striped rabbits were first observed in 1996 by biologist Rob Timmins in a market in Bak Lak in Laos, and the species was described in 2000 and named after Timmins' find.

Its range includes the Northern and Central Annamites, and possibly the Southern Annamites. Very little is known of its ecology, nor why there is a thousand-mile gap between it and its nearest relative, the Sumatran striped rabbit (Nesolagus netscheri). Molecular analysis indicates that the two diverged from a common ancestor about eight million years ago. They may have survived in forested refugia that remained when glacial ice sheets retreated after the last ice age.

Threats to the species are hunting, either by snare or less likely by dogs and habitat loss which makes it more vulnerable to hunters. The most significant threats are snares, and cultivation at lower altitudes and agriculture throughout and the least but increasing threats are extensive road building which opens undisturbed area to farmers and timber harvesters, dams and mining. It Is found in conservation areas Phong Nha-Kẻ Bàng National Park, Nakai–Nam Theun and Umat. Laos and Vietnam both have no conservation measures for this species. Records show Annamite striped rabbits can be common in suitable habitats and other areas show as uncommon and rare. The International Union for Conservation of Nature has assessed its conservation status as endangered based on the high level of snaring activity in Vietnam, which is causing sharp declines in all ground-dwelling small mammals in the region.

References

External links 

 Striped rabbit revealed in Laos forest at bbc.co.uk
 Camera-shy deer caught for first time at phys.org
 British expedition set out on a three month trip to track down the world’s rarest rabbit, finds it on the first night. Daily Hype Online

Leporidae
Mammals described in 2000
Taxa named by Alexei V. Abramov
Mammals of Vietnam